The National Football League (NFL) is a professional American football league consisting of 32 teams, divided equally between the National Football Conference (NFC) and the American Football Conference (AFC). The NFL is one of the four major professional sports leagues in North America, and the highest professional level of American football in the world. The NFL was founded in 1920. In the course of its existence, it has merged with the All-America Football Conference (AAFC) and the American Football League (AFL) to create the current NFL. The history and records of the AFL were incorporated into the NFL.

In the 103-year history of the NFL, there have been 518 head coaches, 29 of whom are currently active as head coaches. George Halas has the longest tenure of any NFL head coach, with a career spanning 40 years. Don Shula, who had a 33-year coaching career spanning from 1963 to 1995, has coached the most overall games with 526 (490 regular season games and 36 postseason games).

Key

Coaches
 Note: Statistics are correct through the end of the 2022 NFL season.

Champion coaches

Playoff coaches

Remaining coaches

See also
 List of current National Football League head coaches
 List of National Football League head coach wins leaders

References 

head coaches